VNU-HCM High School for the Gifted (Vietnamese: Trường Phổ thông Năng khiếu, Đại học Quốc gia Thành phố Hồ Chí Minh) is a highly selective high school located in Ho Chi Minh City, Vietnam. It is classified as a specialized public high school.

Established in 1996, HSG is affiliated with Vietnam National University, Ho Chi Minh City and is a specialized high school for highly talented students in academic subjects such as mathematics, natural sciences, literature, and foreign languages. It is considered one of the best high schools in Vietnam, and one of the three most selective specialized high schools in Ho Chi Minh City, along with Lê Hồng Phong High School and Trần Đại Nghĩa High School.

The school aims to provide the best environment for academic excellence and preparation for higher education, and regularly sends students to participate in regional, national, and international academic competitions, especially in the International Science Olympiads.

History 
The school was established in 1993 and was originally affiliated with Ho Chi Minh City University of Science as the Specialized School in Mathematics and Informatics for high school students. By 1996, the school has moved to its current main campus in District 5, expanded its programs of specialization, and become an independent high school that operates directly under Vietnam National University, Ho Chi Minh City under the new name. HSG opened its second campus in Thu Duc in 2014.

Admissions 

Based on performance in HSG's separate entrance examination, about 300 students are selected every year from more than 3000 applicants for each subject, who hail from not only Ho Chi Minh City but all the Southern provinces. Specialized students receive tuition remissions, and scholarships are awarded to the top students in each class each semester.

Academics 
In addition to the national high school curriculum, HSG offers rigorous, specialized instruction in eight subjects: English, Mathematics, Computer Science, Physics, Chemistry, Biology, and Literature, History. The school also admits students to non-specialized classes who seek to prepare for university entrance examinations in Groups A and D (see Higher education in Vietnam). Teachers at HSG are also professors from the various campuses of Vietnam National University. Classes at the school are known for their innovative critical and creative approaches, as well as for being highly challenging and often incorporating university-level materials.

HSG is best known for both its students' top performance in the Vietnam University Admission Rankings, and its long-standing record in academic competitions for high school students at both national and international levels. In particular, HSG students consistently win first and second places in the National Academic Competitions, the most intense competitions for high school students in Vietnam, and are regularly among those selected to represent Vietnam in the International Mathematical Olympiad and the International Olympiad in Informatics.

References 

High schools for the gifted in Vietnam
Educational institutions established in 1996
1996 establishments in Vietnam
Education in Ho Chi Minh City